De vrais mensonges is a 2010 French comedy-romance film starring Audrey Tautou and directed by Pierre Salvadori. The screenplay was written by Salvadori and Benoît Graffin.

It was distributed in English-speaking countries under the titles Beautiful Lies and Full Treatment.

Plot
Émilie (Audrey Tautou), co-owner of a hair salon, receives an anonymous love letter from her worker Jean (Sami Bouajila) who, unknown to Émilie, is highly educated but took up the handy-man job in the salon after a depression. Émilie doesn't fall for the love letter but passes it on to her mother Maddy (Nathalie Baye) who is depressed since the breakup of her marriage. Maddy falls for the love letter and is in high spirits again. Jean's high education as a translator in several Asian and European languages is uncovered in a verbal fight in Chinese with two women. Émilie is now fearing criticism from Jean as her education is no match to his.

In the meanwhile Maddy is losing her high spirits as no new letter arrives. Émilie then writes new anonymous letters to her mother, but Maddy heavily criticizes them for there lack of style and emotion. To avoid Jean, Émilie sends him out to do errands, posting the mail is one of them and when he runs out of stamps he delivers one letter by himself, another anonymous faux love letter from Émilie to Maddy. Maddy sees Jean putting the letter in her letter box and follows him back to the salon. Consequently believing him to be her secret admirer Maddy flirts with him.

Cast
 Audrey Tautou as Émilie 
 Nathalie Baye as Maddy, mother of Émilie
 Sami Bouajila as Jean 
  as Sylvia, partner with Émilie in the hair salon "Les intondables"
 Judith Chemla as Paulette, a timid employee
 Daniel Duval as father of Émilie

Production
Filming began on 8 June 2009. De vrais mensonges was mostly shot in the Languedoc-Roussillon region, except for two days spent in Paris. Filming was completed on 5 August.

Reception
Xan Brooks from The Guardian gave the film two out of five stars and stated "Audrey Tautou plays stupid cupid in this excitable comedy, a cut-price, candy-coated update on Jane Austen's Emma that bounces along the marina at Sete with its blood sugar through the roof." Brooks added that Bouajila was the only actor who "emerges with his dignity relatively intact." TVNZ's Darren Bevan gave the film six out of ten and commented "Beautiful Lies is a piece of French fluff; beautifully shot in a bright French town - it has all the breeziness within but is insubstantial and instantly forgettable."

See also
 List of French films of 2010

References

External links
 

2010 films
Films directed by Pierre Salvadori
2010 romantic comedy films
French romantic comedy films
2010s French films